Bennie Luke Davis (May 12, 1928September 23, 2012) was a United States Air Force general who served as the commander-in-chief of Strategic Air Command, and as the director of Joint Strategic Target Planning Staff, with its headquarters at Offutt Air Force Base, Nebraska. The command was the major American nuclear deterrent force with bombers, tankers, reconnaissance aircraft and intercontinental ballistic missiles. The Joint Strategic Target Planning Staff coordinated United States nuclear war plans and develops the Single Integrated Operational Plan.

Early life and education
Davis was born in McAlester, Oklahoma on May 12, 1928. He graduated from the United States Military Academy at West Point in 1950 with a commission as a second lieutenant and a bachelor of science degree. He earned a Master of Science degree from The George Washington University, Washington, D.C., in 1967; and graduated from the Armed Forces Staff College, Norfolk, Virginia, in 1964; and the National War College, Fort Lesley J. McNair, Washington, D.C., in 1967.

Career

After graduation from West Point, Davis entered the U.S. Air Force and attended pilot training at Vance Air Force Base, Oklahoma, earning his pilot wings in August 1951. He then was assigned as a twin-engine pilot at James Connally Air Force Base, Texas.

Davis completed B-29 Superfortress combat crew training in October 1953 and then reported to Okinawa as a B-29 aircraft commander with the 307th and later the 19th Bombardment Wing. He returned to the United States with the 19th Bombardment Wing in June 1954 and served as a B-47 Stratojet aircraft commander and instructor pilot at Pinecastle Air Force Base, Florida. In June 1956 he again moved with the 19th Bombardment Wing, this time to Homestead Air Force Base, Florida.

After completing B-52 combat crew training in September 1961, Davis become a B-52H instructor pilot with the 93rd Bombardment Squadron at Kincheloe Air Force Base, Michigan. In February 1964 he entered the Armed Forces Staff College. He graduated in June 1964 and was assigned to SAC headquarters at Offutt Air Force Base as a requirements officer in the Aerospace Systems Branch, Plans Requirements Division. General Davis entered the National War College in August 1966 and while attending the college earned a master of science degree.

Davis transferred to Clark Air Base in the Philippines, in October 1967 as a B-57 tactical bomber pilot with the 13th Bombardment Squadron. The squadron was later redesignated as Detachment 1, 8th Tactical Bombardment Squadron, and he became its operations officer. He flew more than 350 combat hours on 142 missions over Vietnam.

In August 1968, Davis joined the Organization of the Joint Chiefs of Staff in Washington, D.C., where he served in the Directorate of Operations as an operations officer and later as chief of the Current Operations Branch, Strategic Operations Division. In August 1970 he was assigned as the Air Force member of the Chairman's Staff Group, Office of the Chairman of the Joint Chiefs of Staff. In 1969, he attended the six-week advanced management program at the Harvard School of Business.

Davis transferred to Randolph Air Force Base, Texas, in June 1972 to serve as vice commander, U.S. Air Force Military Personnel Center, and deputy assistant deputy chief of staff for military personnel for Headquarters U.S. Air Force. The center was later redesignated the Manpower and Personnel Center. In June 1974 he became commander of the U.S. Air Force Recruiting Service and deputy chief of staff, recruiting, for Air Training Command.

In July 1975, Davis was assigned as director, personnel plans, Office of the Deputy Chief of Staff, Personnel, Headquarters U.S. Air Force, Washington, D.C. He was named deputy chief of staff, personnel (later manpower and personnel) in June 1977. In April 1979 Davis was promoted to General, and took command of Air Training Command at Randolph Air Force Base. He assumed command of SAC in August 1981.

Later life and death
Davis retired on August 1, 1985, and died September 23, 2012, of natural causes in Georgetown, Texas, where he had been living since his retirement.

Awards and decorations

References

External links
 

1928 births
2012 deaths
George Washington University alumni
United States Air Force personnel of the Vietnam War
Military personnel from Oklahoma
People from McAlester, Oklahoma
Recipients of the Air Medal
Recipients of the Distinguished Flying Cross (United States)
Recipients of the Air Force Distinguished Service Medal
Recipients of the Legion of Merit
Recipients of the Order of the Sword (United States)
Recipients of the Silver Star
United States Air Force generals
United States Military Academy alumni
People from Georgetown, Texas
National War College alumni